The Aie River is a tributary of the Manas  River in the Indian state of Assam. The river originates from Black Mountains (Bhutan). The Aie river flows through the Chirang district of Assam and joins Manas river at Bangpari of Chirang district. Aie means mother in Assamese language. The Dwijing Festival is an annual festival set on the banks of Aie river near the Hagrama bridge of Chirang district which is a colorful celebration of Assam's culture.

References 

Rivers of Assam
Rivers of India